The Browne-King House is a historic house located at 322 King Street in Oviedo, Florida.

Description and history 
It was added to the U.S. National Register of Historic Places on September 20, 2001.

References

External links
 Seminole County listings at National Register of Historic Places

Gallery

Houses on the National Register of Historic Places in Florida
National Register of Historic Places in Seminole County, Florida
Houses in Seminole County, Florida
I-houses in Florida
Vernacular architecture in Florida